Football Club des Girondins de Bordeaux (commonly referred to as Girondins de Bordeaux or simply Bordeaux) is a French women's football club based in the city of Bordeaux. It has been the women's section of FC Girondins de Bordeaux since 2015. The club currently plays in the Division 1 Féminine, the highest division of women's football in France.

European Record

Players

Current squad

References

External links
 

Women's football clubs in France
Division 1 Féminine clubs
FC Girondins de Bordeaux
Football clubs in Nouvelle-Aquitaine